The Handmaid's Tale is a 1985 novel by Margaret Atwood, adapted into a film, an opera and a TV series:

 The Handmaid's Tale (film), 1990 American film
 The Handmaid's Tale (opera), 1990 opera composed by Danish composer Poul Ruders
 The Handmaid's Tale (TV series), American drama web television series

See also
 The Handmaiden, a 2016 South Korean film